The Keris Valley also spelled Kiris is a valley in Ghanche District of Baltiyul, Pakistan. It is located beside the Shyok River lying 39.3 km from Skardu in the east. The valley is at the confluence of the Indus River, and the Shingo River which passes through Kharmang after originating in the Kargil region across the Line of Control.

References 

Baltistan
Populated places in Ghanche District